"It Hit Me Like a Hammer" is a song by American rock band Huey Lewis and the News, released as the second single from their sixth album, Hard at Play, in 1991. The song was co-written by band leader Huey Lewis and songwriter/producer Robert John "Mutt" Lange. The song peaked at  21 on the US Billboard Hot 100, becoming their final top-40 hit in the US, and No. 9 on Canada's RPM Top Singles chart. The single release contains a remix of the song with a saxophone solo that did not appear on the album.

Track listings
7-inch and cassette single
A. "It Hit Me Like a Hammer" – 4:01
B. "Do You Love Me, or What?" – 3:46

12-inch and CD single
 "It Hit Me Like a Hammer" (remix sax solo version) – 4:02
 "It Hit Me Like a Hammer" – 4:01
 "Do You Love Me, or What?" – 3:46

Japanese mini-album
 "It Hit Me Like a Hammer" (single remix)
 "It Hit Me Like a Hammer" (album version)
 "Do You Love Me, or What?"

Charts

Weekly charts

Year-end charts

References

Huey Lewis and the News songs
1991 singles
1991 songs
EMI America Records singles
Songs written by Huey Lewis
Songs written by Robert John "Mutt" Lange